5692 Shirao, provisional designation , is a stony Eunomia asteroid from the middle region of the asteroid belt, approximately 9 kilometers in diameter. It was discovered on 23 March 1992, by Japanese amateur astronomers Kin Endate and Kazuro Watanabe at Kitami Observatory, Hokkaidō, Japan. The asteroid was later named for Japanese geologist and astrophotographer Motomaro Shirao.

Orbit and classification 

Shirao is a member of the Eunomia family, a large group of stony asteroids and the most prominent family in the intermediate main-belt. It orbits the Sun in the central main-belt at a distance of 2.2–3.1 AU once every 4 years and 4 months (1,580 days). Its orbit has an eccentricity of 0.18 and an inclination of 12° with respect to the ecliptic.

The body's observation arc begins  in 1955, with a precovery at Palomar Observatory, 37 years prior to its official discovery observation at Kitami.

Physical characteristics

Rotation period 

In June 2014, a rotational lightcurve of Shirao was obtained from photometric observations made by American astronomer Brian Warner at his Palmer Divide Observatory in Colorado. It gave a well-defined rotation period of  hours with a brightness variation of 0.16 magnitude.

Previous lightcurves were obtained by French astronomer René Roy ( hours, Δ 0.13 mag) in June 2001, by American astronomer Donald P. Pray ( hours, Δ 0.12 mag) in March 2005, and by astronomers Dominique Suys, Hugo Riemis and Jan Vantomme ( hours, Δ 0.15 mag) in September 2006.

Diameter and albedo 

According to the surveys carried out by NASA's Wide-field Infrared Survey Explorer and its subsequent NEOWISE mission, Shirao measures between 9.5 and 9.8 kilometers in diameter and its surface has an albedo of 0.22, while the Collaborative Asteroid Lightcurve Link assumes a standard albedo of 0.21 – derived from 15 Eunomia, the largest member and namesake of this asteroid family – and calculates a diameter of 9.2 kilometers.

Naming 

This minor planet was named after Motomaro Shirao (born 1953), a Japanese geologist and astrophotographer, who is known for his photographs of volcanoes and lunar geological features. The official naming citation was published by the Minor Planet Center on 4 April 1996.

Notes

References

External links 
 Asteroid Lightcurve Database (LCDB), query form (info )
 Dictionary of Minor Planet Names, Google books
 Asteroids and comets rotation curves, CdR – Observatoire de Genève, Raoul Behrend
 Discovery Circumstances: Numbered Minor Planets (5001)-(10000) – Minor Planet Center
 
 

005692
Discoveries by Kin Endate
Discoveries by Kazuro Watanabe
Named minor planets
19920323